Asha Kasliwal is a British physician and President of the Faculty of Sexual and Reproductive Healthcare (FSRH).

Education 
Asha Kasliwal immigrated to the UK in 1995 after studying in Mumbai and working in Oman. After graduation, she was a member of the Royal College of Obstetricians and Gynaecologists (RCOG) trainees committee as a representative of overseas doctors.

Kasliwal's main areas of academic and medical focus are care and clinical standards quality, gynaecology within communities, hormone replacement therapy for women undergoing menopause, pregnancy and abortion, and the commissioning of accessible contraceptive and sexual health resources.

Kasliwal was inspired to pursue medicine by Anandibai Gopal Joshi, one of the earliest known Indian women physicians.

Career 
Other titles that Kasliwal has are: Consultant in Community Gynaecology and Reproductive Health Care, Clinical Director for Manchester's Contraception and Sexual Health service, and Clinical Director for the South Manchester Community Gynaecology service. She is also a specialist member of the "Quality Standards for Contraceptive Services" committee within the National Institute for Health and Care Excellence (NICE), and has been featured in the Royal College of Physicians exhibition, Women in Medicine.

Before becoming the president of FSRH, Kasliwal was the Vice President of Quality and Standards in the FSRH from September 2014 to her election as president of the group, and the Clinical Director & Consultant in Community Gynaecology and Reproductive Health.

As President of FSRH 
Succeeding Chris Wilkson's five year term, Kasliwal became the President of FSRH on 28 July 2016, after being elected to the position in May 2016.

Her priorities within this office include:
 Continue FSRH's engagement with multiple organisations, such as the British Association for Sexual Health and HIV (BASHH), RCGP, and RCOG
 Continue to support Sexual and Reproductive Healthcare (SRH) professionals and commissioners through providing quality standards of care and training
 Expand the inclusivity of all FDRH committees, but particularly nurses and General Practitioners
 FSRH promotion
 Increase the accessibility, availability, and quality of reproductive and sexual healthcare

References

External links 
 Asha Kasliwal's article "Scotland can be a global leader on sexual health" from The Times (London), 14 December 2017
 Read Dr Asha Kasliwal's message from 24 Jan 2017 to FSRH members

Indian women medical doctors
People from Mumbai
Reproductive rights activists
Living people
Year of birth missing (living people)
Indian emigrants to the United Kingdom
British women medical doctors
Fellows of the Royal College of Obstetricians and Gynaecologists